Hogsback Pass is situated in the Eastern Cape province of South Africa on the regional road R345, between Alice and Cathcart.

Mountain passes of the Eastern Cape